Elgiva cucularia is a species of fly in the family Sciomyzidae. It is found in the  Palearctic .
Larvae of E. cucularia are predators of aquatic, pulmonate snails in the families Lymnaeidae, Physidae, and Planorbidae.

References

External links
Images representing Elgiva cucularia at BOLD

Sciomyzidae
Insects described in 1767
Muscomorph flies of Europe
Taxa named by Carl Linnaeus